The Women's artistic team all-around competition at the 2018 Asian Games was held on 21 and 22 August 2018 at the Jakarta International Expo Hall D2.

Schedule
All times are Western Indonesia Time (UTC+07:00)

Results 

Legend
DNS — Did not start

Qualification

Final

References

External links
 Results

Artistic Women Team